Upe Flueckiger,  Urs Peter Flueckiger, is a professor of architecture at Texas Tech University.  A native of Switzerland, Flueckiger is internationally recognized for the design of his house in Lubbock, Texas.

References

Texas Tech University faculty
Living people
Year of birth missing (living people)